Paul Lefebvre may refer to:

 Paul Lefebvre (Canadian politician), Canadian member of parliament 
 Paul E. Lefebvre, United States Marine Corps general
 Paul Lefebvre (Vermont politician), member of the Vermont House of Representatives 
 Paul Lefebvre, a character in The Bureau